

The Helpmann Award for Best Regional Touring Production is an award, presented by Live Performance Australia at the annual Helpmann Awards since 2007. 

The award recognises excellence in a production which has toured in the last three years to no less than five venues across a minimum of two Australian states and territories. At least three of the venues must be regional venues.

Winners and nominees

Source:

See also
Helpmann Awards

References

External links
The official Helpmann Awards website

R